Chalcosyrphus depressus (Shannon, 1925) the Wide-eyed Leafwalker, is a rare species of syrphid fly observed from Idaho and Montana. Hoverflies can remain nearly motionless in flight. The adults are also known as flower flies for they are commonly found on flowers, from which they get both energy-giving nectar and protein-rich pollen.

Distribution
United States

References

Eristalinae
Insects described in 1925
Diptera of North America
Hoverflies of North America
Taxa named by Raymond Corbett Shannon